Eddie Shannon (born January 29, 1977) is an American former professional basketball player.

Shannon, a native of West Palm Beach in Florida, has played his entire career essentially with only one eye. At the age of 10 while playing with some of his seventh-grade friends, Eddie was unintentionally hit in the right eye with a rock, forever altering his vision. Following the accident, he underwent surgery to remove blood clots from his eye, and a year later, had a cataract removed. As an eighth-grader, his vision began to blur, and he could only see shadows. Even with limited vision, Eddie went on to star for Cardinal Newman High School in West Palm Beach which led him to be recruited by the University of Florida (UF) where he became the Florida Gators starting Point Guard and is among the schools all-time leaders in assists and steals. Shannon graduated from UF in 1999.

Despite Shannon continuing to excel on the basketball court, the vision in his right eye got progressively worse. After consulting a doctor, he decided to have a certain type of surgery, known as an Evisceration, which involves removing parts of his eye. He was eventually fitted with a cosmetic prosthesis that covers his damaged cornea leading him to wear goggles when playing, though he has since discarded them.

Most of Shannon's professional career has been played in European leagues which included stints with KK Split in Croatia and Strasbourg IG in France. In all he spent some nine seasons in Europe including a stint as teammate to Australian Boomers center Chris Anstey at PBC Ural Great in Russia.

Eddie Shannon signed as an import player for the Adelaide 36ers midway through the 2010-11 NBL season and made his debut for the club as a substitute against the Wollongong Hawks on December 10, 2010 where he scored 12 points and had 5 assists in a solid debut for his new team. For the rest of the NBL season Shannon started all bar two games for the 36ers, only missing the two games due to an ankle sprain. At the end of the 2010–11 season Shannon had played 18 games for the 36ers and averaged 9.6 points, 2.5 rebounds and 4.4 assists per game.

Following the NBL season, Shannon was released by the 36ers. He then returned home to Florida where he hosted a basketball camp in West Palm Beach on July 23, 2011.

Eddie Shannon is now an assistant coach at Canisius College in Buffalo, New York.

References

Living people
1977 births
ABA League players
Adelaide 36ers players
AEK B.C. players
American expatriate basketball people in Australia
American expatriate basketball people in Croatia
American expatriate basketball people in Cyprus
American expatriate basketball people in France
American expatriate basketball people in Greece
American expatriate basketball people in Italy
American expatriate basketball people in Latvia
American expatriate basketball people in Russia
American expatriate basketball people in Sweden
American men's basketball players
Apollon Limassol BC players
Basketball players from Florida
BK Ventspils players
Dinamo Sassari players
Florida Gators men's basketball players
Greek Basket League players
KK Split players
Pallalcesto Amatori Udine players
PBC Ural Great players
Point guards
SIG Basket players
Sportspeople from West Palm Beach, Florida